The 2021 Montreal Alouettes season was the 54th season for the team in the Canadian Football League and their 66th overall. The Alouettes qualified for the playoffs on November 5, 2021, after the Hamilton Tiger-Cats defeated the BC Lions in week 14. The team's season was ended by the same Tiger-Cats following a 23–12 East Semi-Final loss in Hamilton.

The 2021 CFL season was the second season for Khari Jones as the Alouettes' head coach and offensive coordinator as he had the "interim" tag removed after he agreed to a three-year extension on November 26, 2019. This was his first full season as the team's head coach. This was also the first season with Danny Maciocia as the team's general manager.

An 18-game season schedule was originally released on November 20, 2020, but it was announced on April 21, 2021 that the start of the season would likely be delayed until August and feature a 14-game schedule. On June 15, 2021, the league released the revised 14-game schedule with regular season play beginning on August 5, 2021.

Offseason

CFL Global Draft
The 2021 CFL Global Draft took place on April 15, 2021. With the format being a snake draft, the Alouettes selected sixth in the odd-numbered rounds and fourth in the even-numbered rounds.

CFL National Draft
The 2021 CFL Draft took place on May 4, 2021. The Alouettes had five selections in the six-round draft after the team traded their first-round pick to the Hamilton Tiger-Cats in the trade for Johnny Manziel. The team had the ninth pick in odd rounds and the first pick in even rounds.

Preseason
Due to the shortening of the season, the CFL confirmed that pre-season games would not be played in 2021.

Planned schedule

Regular season

Standings

Schedule
The Alouettes initially had a schedule that featured 18 regular season games beginning on June 11 and ending on October 30. However, due to the COVID-19 pandemic in Canada, the Canadian Football League delayed the start of the regular season to August 5, 2021 and the Alouettes began their 14-game season on August 14, 2021.

 Games played with white uniforms.
 Games played with blue uniforms.

Post-season

Schedule 

 Games played with white uniforms.

Team

Roster

Coaching staff

References

External links
 

Montreal Alouettes seasons
2021 Canadian Football League season by team
2021 in Quebec
2020s in Montreal